Luigi Sarti (born 25 November 1934) is an Italian racing cyclist. He rode in the 1962 Tour de France.

References

External links
 

1934 births
Living people
Italian male cyclists
Place of birth missing (living people)
People from Imola
Sportspeople from the Metropolitan City of Bologna
Cyclists from Emilia-Romagna